Ixtepec Airport (Spanish: Aeropuerto de Ixtepec or Base Aérea Militar N° 2 de Ixtepec (BAM-2 Ixtepec))  is located 12 km south of Ciudad Ixtepec, Oaxaca, México, on land in the Asunción Ixtaltepec municipality. It is used for both civilian and military traffic.

Civilian terminal 

In April 2017 commercial flights started; the first Aeromar flight Mexico City - Ixtepec took place April 26, 2017.

300 million Mexican pesos, around 17 million USD, were spent to prepare the terminal for civilian use.

In 2021, Ixtepec received 6,778 passengers and 7,696 in 2022.

Airlines and destinations

Statistics

Passengers

See also 

List of the busiest airports in Mexico

References

External links
 Ixtepec Airport
 Oaxaca Airports 
 Air bases in Mexico
 
 

Airports in Oaxaca